Gukov is a surname. Notable people with the surname include: 

Aleksandr Gukov (born 1972), Belarus swimmer
Sergei Gukov (born 1977), Russian-American mathematical and theoretical physicist

See also
Gudkov
Lukov (surname)